Mahneshan and Ijrud (electoral district) is the 4th electoral district in the Zanjan Province of Iran.  It has a population of 78,728 and elects 1 member of parliament.

1980
MP in 1980 from the electorate of Mahneshan. (1st)
 Asadollah Bayat-Zanjani

1984
MP in 1984. from the electorate of Mahneshan. (2nd)
 Gholamreza Bayat

1988
MP in 1988 from the electorate of Mahneshan. (3rd)
 Reza Abdollahi

1992
MP in 1992 from the electorate of Mahneshan. (4th)
 Reza Abdollahi

1996
MP in 1996 from the electorate of Mahneshan. (5th)
 Reza Abdollahi

2000
MP in 2000 from the electorate of Mahneshan and Ijrud. (6th)
 Reza Abdollahi

2004
MP in 2004 from the electorate of Mahneshan and Ijrud. (7th)
 Reza Abdollahi

2008
MP in 2008 from the electorate of Mahneshan and Ijrud. (8th)
 Reza Abdollahi

2012
MP in 2012 from the electorate of Mahneshan and Ijrud. (9th)
 Reza Abdollahi

2016

Notes

References

Electoral districts of Zanjan Province
Ijrud County
Mahneshan County
Deputies of Mah Neshan and Ijrud